The Saranac Lakes Wild Forest is a discontinuous  tract designated as Wild Forest by the New York State Department of Environmental Conservation in Franklin and Essex Counties near Saranac Lake, Tupper Lake, and Lake Placid. The area covers large portions of Harrietstown, Santa Clara, and North Elba; smaller portions are in Altamont, St. Armand, Brighton, and Franklin.   The area is served by State Routes NY-3, NY-30, NY-86, and NY-73.

There are 142 bodies of water including Upper, Middle, and Lower Saranac Lakes, Oseetah Lake, Lake Placid, Lake Clear, and Lake Colby; most of the shorelines of these bodies of these lakes are a mix of public and private land. Major rivers include the Raquette and Saranac Rivers.

Activities supported include hiking, snowmobiling, snowshoeing, skiing, mountain biking, canoeing, hunting, fishing, camping, swimming, mountain biking, cross-country skiing, snowshoeing, snowmobiling and bird watching.

Hiking options include  Scarface Mountain,  Boot Bay Mountain and  Shingle Bay Mountain,  Panther Mountain, the Fernow Nature Trail, and the Lake Placid Peninsula Nature Trails.

There are nearly 250 designated campsites, including 90 in the Saranac Islands Campground on Weller Pond and Middle and Lower Saranac Lakes, eighteen on Upper Saranac Lake, 31 on Follensby Clear Pond, and sixteen along Floodwood Road, along with twelve lean-tos on several of the lakes, ponds, and rivers.

There are fifteen boat launches and fishing access sites, located on the Raquette River, Upper and Lower Saranac Lakes, Follensby Clear Pond, Second Pond, Lake Colby, Lake Placid, Lake Flower, Hoel Pond, East Pine Pond, Moose Pond, Little Green Pond, and Little Clear Pond.

See also

List of New York wild forests

External links
New York State Department of Environmental Conservation
NYS DEC Saranac Lakes Wild Forest Map
NYS DEC - Saranac Lake Islands Camping Information

Adirondacks
Protected areas of Essex County, New York
Protected areas of Franklin County, New York
Forests of New York (state)